David Robert Gatherum (born March 28, 1932) is a Canadian former professional ice hockey goaltender. He played 3 games in the National Hockey League with the Detroit Red Wings during the 1953–54 season. The rest of his career, which lasted from 1952 to 1959, was spent in the minor leagues.

Playing career
On October 11, 1953 Gatherum replaced injured Terry Sawchuk to record a shutout in his National Hockey League (NHL) debut for Detroit 4-0 win over Toronto. He then played on October 16 and 17 for Detroit. Terry returned from injury and Gatherum returned to minors having 2 wins, 1 tie. He never lost an NHL game. He also set an NHL record for the longest shutout sequence by a goaltender to start a career 100.21 min Oct 11-16, 1953. The record stood until 2011. He was recalled for playoffs as a spare goaltender and got his name on the Stanley Cup with Detroit in 1954. Gatherum would never play in the NHL again. He spent the rest of his career playing in the minors or senior hockey until retiring after 1959 season.

Career statistics

Regular season and playoffs

References

External links
 
 Picture of Dave Gatherum's Name on the 1954 Stanley Cup Plaque

1932 births
Living people
Canadian ice hockey goaltenders
Detroit Red Wings players
Edmonton Flyers (WHL) players
Ice hockey people from Ontario
New Westminster Royals (WHL) players
Quebec Aces (QSHL) players
St. Louis Flyers players
Shawinigan-Falls Cataracts (QSHL) players
Sherbrooke Saints players
Sportspeople from Thunder Bay
Stanley Cup champions